

Notable REITs
The five largest REITs in the United States in 2021 are: American Tower Corporation, Prologis, Crown Castle International, Simon Property Group and Weyerhaeuser.

Notable publicly traded real estate investment trusts based in the United States include:

References

REIT
Publicly traded companies of the United States